Live on WBAB is the first live concert album by American rock band Crack the Sky. The album was released by Lifesong Records (catalog #LS-100) in 1976 (see 1976 in music), but only to radio stations for promotional purposes. It came in a plain white sleeve with only a sticker identifying the record, and photocopied inserts about the band.

Track listing

Personnel

The band
John Palumbo —  Lead vocals, keyboards, guitar
Rick Witkowski – Lead guitar, percussion
Joe Macre – Bass guitar, back-up vocals
Jim Griffiths – Lead guitar, back-up vocals
Joey D'Amico – Drums, back-up vocals

Production
Terry Cashman — Executive producer
Tommy West – Executive producer
Danny Palumbo – Live sound

Alternate version
In 1988, Lifesong released Live on WBAB on CD (catalog #LSCD 8802). It includes four additional tracks, taken from the 1978 LP Live Sky ("Maybe I Can Fool Everybody (Tonight)", "Lighten Up McGraw", "She's a Dancer", "I Am the Walrus").

References

Crack the Sky live albums
1976 live albums